Last Words is a 2012 EP by Canadian record producer Ryan Hemsworth. It was released on Wedidit. It features remixes from Shlohmo, Supreme Cuts, Baauer, Sam Tiba, and Canblaster. Music videos were created for "Charly Wingate" and "Colour & Movement".

Critical reception

Will Butler of East Bay Express said, "With Last Words, Hemsworth leaves his initial experimentation behind and clocks in with an inspiring personal best, both in style and technique." Paul Lester of The Guardian noted elements of Aphex Twin's Selected Ambient Works 85–92 in the production of Last Words.

Potholes in My Blog placed it at number 3 on the "15 Best EPs of 2012" list.

Track listing

References

External links
 

2012 EPs
Ryan Hemsworth albums
Instrumental hip hop EPs